Southtown Generals is an American reggae rock band which was started by P.O.D. drummer Noah "Wuv" Bernardo and Rasta Tim Pacheco, lead vocalist from the Latin influenced reggae band Psydecar. The band's official debut performance took place at the annual Seedless Clothing 420 party at the Belly Up Tavern in Solana Beach, California in April 2009.  Other band members include bassist Dante Thomas from the band Agua Dulce, guitarist Anders Pellmark and keyboardist Jimmy Kiy.

The debut album from Southtown Generals was released on November 26, 2010. It features fourteen musical tracks with a heavy roots, rock, reggae mix.

References

P.O.D. website.The latest news section  http://www.payableondeath.com/index2.html
Southtown Generals Myspace   http://www.myspace.com/southtowngenerals

American reggae musical groups